Jonathan E. Aviv (born August 24, 1960) is an American otolaryngologist–head and neck surgeon and a professor of Otolaryngology–Head and Neck Surgery at Icahn School of Medicine at Mount Sinai Hospital in New York City, New York. He is also Clinical Director of the Voice and Swallowing Center at ENT and Allergy Associates in New York City, New York.
An inventor, author, educator, physician and surgeon, he is best known for his invention of Flexible Endoscopic Evaluation of Swallowing with Sensory Testing (FEESST), a medical device that allows office-based assessment of oropharyngeal dysphagia, or swallowing disorders, without the use of X-ray.  He is also known for his development of Transnasal Esophagoscopy (TNE), a method of examining the esophagus without using conscious or intravenous sedation. 
From 1991 to 2009, he was a full-time academic surgeon and director of the division of head and neck surgery at Columbia University College of Physicians and Surgeons.

Early life and education 
Aviv was born in New York City New York and raised in Los Angeles, California. He graduated from Beverly Hills High School and received his bachelor's degree in Chemistry at Columbia College of Columbia University, and his Doctor of Medicine from the College of Physicians and Surgeons of Columbia University in 1985. he completed his residency in Otolaryngology–Head and Neck Surgery at the Mount Sinai Hospital (Manhattan), New York and completed a fellowship in micro-vascular head and neck reconstruction in 1990-1991.

Career

Medical practice 
Aviv had an 18-year academic career as an attending physician at the Columbia University Medical Center  and as a Professor of Otolaryngology–Head and Neck Surgery at the Columbia University College of Physicians and Surgeons. In the Department of Otolaryngology–Head and Neck Surgery he served as Director of Microvascular Head and Neck Reconstruction, Director of Head and Neck Surgery and then Director of the Voice and Swallowing Center. He has published medical journal articles on microvascular head and neck reconstruction, tongue reconstruction and developed a method of restoring sensation to the throat using microsurgical techniques. He has also published numerous journal articles related to Flexible Endoscopic Evaluation of Swallowing with Sensory Testing (FEESST),Transnasal esophagoscopy (TNE), acid reflux disease and cough. He has authored or co-authored two textbooks and most recently a health and wellness book designed for the lay public called Killing Me Softly From Inside: The Mysteries and Dangers of Acid Reflux and Its connection to America's Fastest Growing Cancer with a Diet that may save your life.  He is licensed to practice medicine in New York and New Jersey. 
In 2009 he left Columbia to join the largest Ear, Nose and Throat practice in the United States, ENT and Allergy Associates LLP, in New York City, NY. There he founded and became clinical director of the practices Voice and Swallowing Division.

National committees 
In 1997, Aviv was appointed to be a Technical Advisor to the Agency for Health Care Policy and Research (AHCPR) branch of the Department  of  Health & Human Services, now Center for Medicaid and Medicare Services (CMS) regarding the diagnosis and treatment of swallowing disorders in older patients, which dovetailed with his appointment from 1996-2001 to the Functional Outcomes Task Force on Dysphagia by the American Speech and Hearing Association. He represented the American Academy of Otolaryngology–Head and Neck Surgery as Chairman of its Committee on Speech, Voice and Swallowing Disorders from 1997-2003. One of the significant accomplishments during these years was the development of a new series of CPT codes for office-based evaluation and treatment of swallowing disorders which carry on to this day.

Aviv was also President of   the American Broncho-Esophagological Association 2005-2006, and the New York Laringological Society  in 2004.

Honors 
Aviv was awarded the Columbia-Presbyterian Medical Center- Clinical Trials Award in 1993 as well as the Florence and Herbert Irving Scholarship Award from Columbia University, College of Physicians and Surgeons 1993-1996. He was awarded the American Broncho-Esophagological Association- Broyles-Maloney Award-1995, the Honor Award- American Academy of Otolaryngology–Head and Neck Surgery in 1997, The Maxwell Abramson Memorial Award for Excellence in Teaching and Service-
Columbia University- 1997/1998.

In 2004 he was selected to give the   Chevalier Jackson Lecture to the American Broncho-Esophagological Association, and in 2005 gave the	State of the Art Lecture- American Laryngological Association 2005. In 2006, Aviv was made a Lifetime Honorary Member of the Israeli Society of Otolaryngology/Head & Neck Surgery.
Jonathan Aviv has been in New York Magazine's “Best Doctors” for 15 consecutive years 1998-2013 and been in Best Doctors in America for the last 10 consecutive years 2004-2013.

Personal life 
In 1998, Aviv married Robin Kiam, daughter of Victor Kiam in a Jewish ceremony in Manhattan.  They had three children and later divorced. He is now married to Samara Aviv and they live in New York City.

Bibliography

Books

Aviv JE, Murry T. FEESST (Flexible Endoscopic Evaluation of Swallowing with Sensory Testing). Plural Publishing Co. San Diego, CA. 2005.
Postma G, Belafsky P, Aviv JE. Atlas of Transnasal Esophagoscopy. Lippincott, Williams & Wilkins. Philadelphia, PA. 2006.
Aviv JE. Killing Me Softly From Inside. The  Mysteries and Dangers of Acid Reflux and Its Connection to America's Fastest Growing Cancer with a Diet That May Save Your Life. Create Space Independent Publishing Platform. North Charleston, SC. 2014.

References 

1960 births
Living people
American otolaryngologists
Columbia University Vagelos College of Physicians and Surgeons alumni
Columbia College (New York) alumni
Beverly Hills High School alumni